Paoay, officially the Municipality of Paoay, is a 4th class municipality in the province of Ilocos Norte, Philippines. According to the 2020 census, it has a population of 25,001 people.

The town is home to the Paoay Church, a UNESCO World Heritage Site.

Geography

Barangays
Paoay is politically subdivided into 31 barangays. These barangays are headed by elected officials: Barangay Captain, Barangay Council, whose members are called Barangay Councilors. All are elected every three years.

 Bacsil
 Cabagoan
 Cabangaran
 Callaguip
 Cayubog
 Dolores
 Laoa
 Masintoc
 Monte
 Mumulaan
 Nagbacalan
 Nalasin
 Nanguyudan
 Oaig-Upay-Abulao
 Pambaran
 Pannaratan (Poblacion)
 Paratong
 Pasil
 Salbang (Poblacion)
 San Agustin
 San Blas (Poblacion)
 San Juan
 San Pedro
 San Roque (Poblacion)
 Sangladan Pob. (Nalbuan)
 Santa Rita (Poblacion)
 Sideg
 Suba
 Sungadan
 Surgui
 Veronica

Climate

Demographics

Economy

Government
Paoay, belonging to the second congressional district of the province of Ilocos Norte, is governed by a mayor designated as its local chief executive and by a municipal council as its legislative body in accordance with the Local Government Code. The mayor, vice mayor, and the councilors are elected directly by the people through an election which is being held every three years.

Elected officials

Paoay Lake

Another prominent feature of the municipality is Paoay Lake.  Legend has it that it was the site of a prosperous barangay called San Juan de Sahagún (Saint John of Sahagún) that sank following an earthquake.

On the shores of the lake lies a mansion once used by the Marcoses called Malacañang of the North; it is now a museum. Adjacent to the mansion is the Paoay Golf Course.

Gallery

References

External links

 
 [ Philippine Standard Geographic Code]
Philippine Census Information
Local Governance Performance Management System

Municipalities of Ilocos Norte